Garfield Heights is a city in Cuyahoga County, Ohio, United States. It is a suburb of Cleveland. The population was 28,849 at the time of the 2010 census.

Geography
Garfield Heights is located at  (41.421423, -81.602682).

History
The area was originally part of Newburgh Township. The Village of South Newburgh was formed in 1907, and it was incorporated as Garfield Heights in 1930. The city is named after Garfield Park, which in turn was named in honor of President James A. Garfield.

Economy

Marymount Hospital, part of the Cleveland Clinic system, is the city's largest employer.

The Ohio Department of Transportation has its District 12 headquarters in the city.

In 2007, Garfield Heights and its neighbor Maple Heights were mentioned by CNN/Money as two of America's most affordable communities.

The Garfield Heights Chamber of Commerce was established in the 1960s and includes over 250 business members from the area.

Chart Industries, a gas tank manufacturer, has its world headquarters located in Garfield Heights.

The Ohio Catholic Federal Credit Union, one of the largest credit unions in Ohio, is based in Garfield Heights. As of 2011, it had 17,456 members and $155 million in assets.

Law and government

Garfield Heights has seven wards and a mayor-council form of government. The city's charter went into effect in 1956. The city also has a municipal court that serves several jurisdictions.
The council president is selected by members of city council. If the mayor's seat is vacated, the council president would assume the duties, according to the city charter.

Mayors of Garfield Heights

Public safety
The city maintains its own police and fire departments.
The city has a network of emergency warning sirens. The sirens are routinely tested at noon on the first Saturday of every month. A Community Emergency Response Team is in place. Garfield Heights uses traffic signal preemption.

Recreation
The Dan Kostel Recreation Center is located on Turney Road at the Civic Center complex and includes an outdoor swimming pool open during summer season only and an indoor ice skating rink.
Garfield Park Reservation, part of the regional Cleveland Metroparks system, is located in the Northeast corner of Garfield Heights on its border with Cleveland.

Demographics

The ethnic groups of Garfield Heights include Poles, Slovenes, Italians, Irish, and African-Americans.

93.4% spoke English, 2.8% Polish, 1.2% Italian, and 1.2% Spanish.

2010 census
As of the census of 2010, there were 28,849 people, 11,691 households, and 7,393 families residing in the city. The racial makeup of the city was 60.2% White, 35.7% African American, 0.2% Native American, 1.3% Asian, 0.6% from other races, and 2.1% from two or more races. Hispanic or Latino of any race were 2.3% of the population.

There were 11,691 households, of which 32.8% had children under the age of 18 living with them, 36.5% were married couples living together, 21.3% had a female householder with no husband present, 5.4% had a male householder with no wife present, and 36.8% were non-families. 31.8% of all households were made up of individuals, and 13.5% had someone living alone who was 65 years of age or older. The average household size was 2.43 and the average family size was 3.08.

The median age in the city was 38.5 years. 25% of residents were under the age of 18; 8.4% were between the ages of 18 and 24; 25.1% were from 25 to 44; 26% were from 45 to 64; and 15.4% were 65 years of age or older. The gender makeup of the city was 46.0% male and 54.0% female.

2000 census
As of the census of 2000, there were 30,734 people, 12,452 households, and 8,205 families residing in the city. The population density was 1,641.3/km sq (4,253.0/mi sq). There were 12,998 housing units at an average density of 694.1/km sq (1,798.7/mi sq). The racial makeup of the city was 80.72% White, 16.80% African American, 0.16% Native American, 0.93% Asian, 0.01% Pacific Islander, 0.43% from Race (United States Census) other races, and 0.96% from two or more races. Hispanic or Latino of any race were 1.26% of the population.

There were 12,452 households, out of which 28.9% had children under the age of 18 living with them, 46.5% were married couples living together, 15.3% had a female householder with no husband present, and 34.1% were non-families. 30.0% of all households were made up of individuals, and 14.4% had someone living alone who was 65 years of age or older. The average household size was 2.43 and the average family size was 3.04.

In the city, the population was spread out, with 24.1% under the age of 18, 7.3% from 18 to 24, 29.3% from 25 to 44, 20.7% from 45 to 64, and 18.6% who were 65 years of age or older. The median age was 38 years. For every 100 females, there were 87.6 males. For every 100 females age 18 and over, there were 82.4 males.

The median income for a household in the city was $39,278, and the median income for a family was $47,557. Males had a median income of $35,435 versus $26,472 for females. The per capita income for the city was $18,988. About 6.0% of families and 8.5% of the population were below the poverty line, including 11.9% of those under age 18 and 9.2% of those age 65 or over.

Education

Garfield Heights has its own public school system comprising three elementary schools, one middle school, and one high school. It is governed by a five-member elected board. There are two Catholic schools in the city; St. Benedict and Trinity High School.

In 2001, Garfield Heights voters approved a levy to build a new high school. Construction of the school began soon thereafter and was completed in mid-2003. In 2006, ground was broken for the construction of the high school arts and drama complex, a $5 million building. Construction of the 750-seat Garfield Heights Matousek Center for the Performing Arts started in November 2006. The performing arts center opened on November 3, 2007.

In 2010–11 school year both Elmwood Elementary and Maple Leaf Intermediate were renovated and Maple Leaf School gained more classrooms and a bigger gym. Maple Leaf School is the Garfield Heights City School District's oldest building built in 1925 and was the smallest until the current reconstruction

Media
Garfield Heights is served by the Cleveland television stations and numerous cable and satellite providers. The Cleveland Plain Dealer, and the Neighborhood News-Garfield Heights Tribune (published each Wednesday) are the main newspapers.

Notable people
 Steve Bartek, American guitarist, film composer, conductor 
 James Jude Courtney, American actor and stunt performer
 William A. Foster, earned the Medal of Honor
 Dennis Fryzel, last football coach at the University of Tampa
 DeJuan Groce, cornerback in the NFL
 Dale Miller former Ohio State Senator
 Gene Mruczkowski former NFL offensive lineman and Super Bowl champ with the New England Patriots
 Scott Mruczkowski, former football center for the San Diego Chargers
 Phil Pozderac former NFL offensive lineman and Super Bowl champ with the Dallas Cowboys
Jerry Schuplinski former NFL QB and quality control coach for New England Patriots, Miami Dolphins and New York Giants
 David J. Skal, American cultural historian, critic, writer
 Wilma Smith, former Cleveland news anchor
 James Glenwright Unger, American hockey player

Surrounding communities

References

 Garfield Heights History c. 1976 Garfield Heights Historical Society
Garfield Heights city data at City-data.com
 Cuyahoga Public Library - History of Garfield Heights Library

External links

 

Cities in Ohio
Cities in Cuyahoga County, Ohio
Populated places established in 1786
Polish communities in the United States
Cleveland metropolitan area
 
1786 establishments in the Northwest Territory